Corybantes delopia is a moth in the family Castniidae first described by Herbert Druce in 1907. It is found in Ecuador.

References

Moths described in 1907
Castniidae